The Indianapolis Racers were a major league hockey team in the World Hockey Association (WHA) from 1974 to 1978. They competed in four full seasons before folding 25 games into the 1978–79 season. They played at Market Square Arena. They are often best known for being the first professional team to secure the services of Wayne Gretzky and Mark Messier.

The Racers were known in the WHA for their sometimes-fanatical fans. The franchise led the WHA in attendance for the 1976–77 season. The Racers won the 1975–76 WHA Eastern Division championship and swept the rival Cincinnati Stingers in the 1977 WHA playoffs. Notable players for the Racers include Wayne Gretzky, Mark Messier, Pat Stapleton, Dave Keon, Michel Dion and Kim Clackson. The Racers' best-known coach, Jacques Demers, later led the Montreal Canadiens to win the Stanley Cup in 1992–93.

Demise
At the time of the Racers' founding, the only other major league competitor was the Indiana Pacers of the similarly-upstart American Basketball Association. As merger and expansion discussions heated up in both established leagues, the question of Indianapolis' inclusion proved a complicated one. Both the NBA and the NHL believed Indianapolis was far too small to support teams in both sports in the long term, and were reluctant to risk the embarrassment of placing a failed franchise there. For this reason among others, the Pacers were seen for a long time to have a slim chance to be included in the eventual ABA-NBA merger. Nevertheless, to the surprise of many sports fans and pundits of the time the Pacers were ultimately included in the merger, so that starting in 1976, the WHA would have to compete with the established NBA in Indiana. While the Racers continued to attract strong fan support for awhile, this turned out to be the beginning of the end for the team.

The Racers' demise came under the stewardship of Nelson Skalbania, a flamboyant Canadian real estate businessman. Skalbania, who regularly flipped real estate property and sports franchises for a profit, was repeatedly accused of mismanaging the promising Indianapolis hockey market and plotting to move the franchise to Canada, where it would presumably have had a much better chance of being included in an eventual merger the WHA was negotiating with the National Hockey League (NHL). Having taken the firm position that no surviving Canadian WHA teams would be excluded from a merger, and knowing the NHL was barely willing to even consider taking in a small number of WHA teams, the WHA was not willing to risk upsetting delicate merger negotiations and rebuffed all proposals to add more teams in Canada.

Unable to move his team, Skalbania looked elsewhere to gain leverage in the ongoing merger discussions. He turned to underage players – the NHL had stringent rules regarding the age of players they could sign while the WHA regularly signed underage players. Skalbania's best-known signing was that of 17-year-old future superstar Wayne Gretzky, who signed a personal services contract worth between $1.125 and $1.75 million over four to seven years – at the time, one of the largest contracts ever offered a hockey player. The move did not improve the team's desperate financial situation, and just eight games into the 1978–79 season Skalbania liquidated his greatest asset to his old friend and former (and future) business partner, Peter Pocklington, owner of the Edmonton Oilers. Pocklington purchased Gretzky and two other Indianapolis players, goaltender Eddie Mio and forward Peter Driscoll, paying a reported $700,000 for the contracts of the three players, although the announced price was $850,000. The Racers folded 17 games later on December 15, 1978, ending major league hockey in Indianapolis.

The other six WHA teams finished the season, and before the Winnipeg Jets won the 1979 Avco World Trophy, the league accepted the terms of a merger with the NHL whereby Edmonton, Winnipeg, Quebec, and New England would enter the NHL as "expansion teams" the following season and the WHA itself would cease operations. Cincinnati and Birmingham, the other surviving WHA teams, were paid to disband.

Legacy
Mark Messier also began his career with the Racers in the 1978–79 season, playing five games but failing to register a point before finishing his tryout contract. He was picked up later by Cincinnati for the remainder of the season, before being selected by the Oilers in the 1979 NHL Entry Draft. Messier retired in 2004 as the last active player to have played in the WHA, and also the last active player to have played for the Racers.

Skalbania himself would ultimately become an NHL owner a year after the merger when he fronted a Calgary-based ownership group that purchased the Atlanta Flames and moved them north, where they became the Calgary Flames.

Season-by-season record
Note: GP = Games played, W = Wins, L = Losses, T = Ties, Pts = Points, GF = Goals for, GA = Goals against, PIM = Penalties in minutes

See also
List of Indianapolis Racers players
List of WHA seasons
Indiana Ice
Indianapolis Ice
Indy Fuel

References

External links
WHA Racers history page
WHA Hall of Fame

 
World Hockey Association teams
Racers
Ice hockey clubs established in 1974
Sports clubs disestablished in 1978
Defunct ice hockey teams in the United States
Ice hockey teams in Indiana
1974 establishments in Indiana
1978 disestablishments in Indiana